Monkerton is a small hamlet in the village of Pinhoe in the county of Devon. Pinhoe Railway Station is situated there.

Monkerton is set to expand hugely from 2015 onwards, with housing developers gaining planning permission to build properties. Barratt David Wilson are currently due to build 178 units, including social housing and private housing. They have proposed to incorporate their homes into the natural wildlife of the area and enhance their habitats at the same time.

Exeter College has also built an "engineering and mechanics" college near by. This and the local amenities will be huge factors in peoples decisions to live in Monkerton.

Hamlets in Devon
Areas of Exeter